The minister of state for development and Africa, formerly the minister of state for development and the secretary of state for international development, is a senior minister of the Crown within the Government of the United Kingdom.

The officeholder headed the Department for International Development (DFID) as secretary of state from 1997 to 2020. The office formed part of the British Cabinet. The Department for International Development was abolished in September 2020, and Anne-Marie Trevelyan was the final holder of the post.

The post was made a ministerial position attending Cabinet in the Foreign, Commonwealth and Development Office in 2022. The corresponding shadow minister is the shadow cabinet minister for international development.

Responsibilities

Former 
Corresponding to what is generally known as an international development minister in many other countries, the International Development Minister's remit includes:

 Oversight of development aid
 Oversight of international development (developing countries)
 Delivery and management of spending 0.7% GNI on development
 Communications for international development

Current 
The Minister of State for Development and Africa’s responsibilities are:

 Africa
 International Development Strategy, Official Development Assistance (ODA), Independent Commisison for Aid Impact (ICAI)
 British Investment Partnerships
 International finance
 global education, gender and equality (including scholarships)
 global health
 humanitarian and migration
 safeguarding
 research and evidence (including Chief Scientific Advised)

History
A separate Ministry of Overseas Development was established by Harold Wilson when he came to office in 1964. The first three holders of the office served in the Cabinet, but from 29 August 1967 the office was demoted. Under Edward Heath, the Ministry was re-incorporated into the FCO on 15 October 1970. Wilson again established the Ministry in 1974, but later merged it into the FCO once again: from 10 June 1975 to 8 October 1979 the foreign secretary served as Secretary of State for Foreign and Commonwealth Affairs and Minister for Overseas Development in the cabinet, while the minister for overseas development held the rank of Minister of State within the Foreign and Commonwealth Office. The minister of state had day-to-day responsibility. Under the Labour government of the 1970s, Reg Prentice sat in the Cabinet during his term. The post's last and main format was created in 1997 when the Department for International Development was made independent of the Foreign and Commonwealth Office (FCO).

In June 2020, it was announced the Department for International Development would be dissolved, and its operations would be merged into the Foreign and Commonwealth Office. The process was completed by 2 September 2020, with the last international development secretary Anne-Marie Trevelyan remaining in place until that time.

The position was revived at a Minister of State attending Cabinet role in 2022

List of Ministers and Secretaries of State

* Incumbent's length of term last updated: .

References

International Development
Ministerial offices in the United Kingdom
1964 establishments in the United Kingdom
2020 disestablishments in the United Kingdom
Department for International Development